Cali Jean Farquharson (born December 17, 1993) is an American professional soccer player currently playing in NWSL for Houston Dash.

Early life
Born in Yokota, Japan, Farquharson attended Shadow Mountain High School in Phoenix, Arizona where she was named the most valuable player of the girls' soccer team during her freshman season. She led the team in goals during her junior year. In 2012, she was named to the East Valley Tribune's all-Division II second team.

Farquharson played club soccer for SC Del Sol '94 in the Elite Clubs National League (ECNL). She was twice named to the league's All-Event Team.

Arizona Sun Devils, 2012–2015
Farquharson attended Arizona State University from 2012 to 2015 where she played for the Arizona State Sun Devils.

Club career

Washington Spirit, 2016–2019
Farquharson was selected 12th overall by the Washington Spirit in the 2016 NWSL College Draft. She made her debut for the club during the season opener against Boston Breakers on April 16, 2016. In 2016, the rookie played in 16 games, 8 starts, totaling 561 minutes. She tore her left ACL during a match against Seattle Reign FC on September 7, 2016, which ended her first professional season.

Farquharson missed significant time in the 2018 season after suffering a left tibial stress injury. In February 2019, she re-signed with the Spirit.  Farquharson went on to play 541 minutes with six starts in 2019.  She was released by the club at the end of the 2019 season along with 8 other Washington Spirit players.

Following her release by the Spirit, Farquharson was selected in the End of Season Re-Entry wire by the Utah Royals in November 2019.  She was subsequently waived by Utah in December 2019.

See also

References

External links 
 
 Washington Spirit player profile
 Arizona State Sun Devils player profile
 
 

1993 births
Living people
American women's soccer players
National Women's Soccer League players
Washington Spirit players
Soccer players from Phoenix, Arizona
Arizona State Sun Devils women's soccer players
Women's association football forwards
Washington Spirit draft picks
Damallsvenskan players
KIF Örebro DFF players
Houston Dash players